Sia Berkeley (born 24 April 1985) is an English actress. She is best known for her television work, perhaps most for playing Scarlett in the television series Skins.

Career
Berkeley graduated from the Royal Academy of Dramatic Art in 2006.  In her last year there, she was nominated for the 2006 Spotlight Prize. She made her West End stage debut in May 2009 at the Trafalgar Studios in the play Ordinary Dreams; Or How to Survive a Meltdown with Flair

Filmography

Film

Television

References

External links

English television actresses
1985 births
Alumni of RADA
Living people